Dharamdas was an Indian saint, Bhojpuri-Language poet and one of the disciples of Kabir. It is said that after becoming Kabir's disciple, he gave away all his rich possessions.

Life 
Dharamdas was born into a rich Vaishya family near Jabalpur of Madhya Pradesh. Dharamdas made two gurus in his life: the first Guru was Roopdas and the second Guru was Kabir Saheb. The name of Dharamdas' wife was Amini Devi. He had two sons, the first son was Narayan Das who opposed Kabir Saheb's knowledge and the second son was Chudamani (Muktamani).

Spiritual journey
Since childhood, he was very religious. He used to like attending Satsang, Puja, pilgrimages, etc. Earlier, he used to worship idols.One day he met with Kabir. Both discussed spiritual knowledge. In the first meeting, he did not accept the spiritual knowledge that was given by Kabir. But after he understood the spiritual knowledge from Kabir, he left  idols' worship. After giving initiation to Dharamdas, Kabir Saheb took him to the Satlok (Immortal place). After coming from satlok, he wrote Kabir Sagar, Kabir Beejak, and Kabir Sakhi which were narrated by Kabir Saheb.

Evidence in his speech:

Aaj mohe darshan diyo ji Kabir ||tek|| Satyalok se chal kar aaye, kaatan jam ki janjeer ||1|| Thaare darshan se mhaare paap katat hain, nirmal hovae ji shareer ||2|| Amrit bhojan mhaare Satguru jeemaen, shabd doodh ki kheer ||3|| Hindu ke tum Dev kahaaye, Musalmaan ke peer ||4|| Dono deen ka jhagda chhid gayaa, tohe na paaye shareer || 5|| Dharmdas ki arj Gosaain, beda lagaaio parle teer ||6||

See also
 Kabirpant
 Sachkhand

References

Saints
Bhojpuri-language writers
Indian poets